"Robbie" is a science fiction short story by American writer Isaac Asimov. It was his first robot story and writing commenced on June 10, 1939. It was first published in the September 1940 issue Super Science Stories magazine as "Strange Playfellow", a title that was chosen by editor Frederik Pohl and described as "distasteful" by Asimov. A revised version of "Robbie" was reprinted under Asimov's original title in the collections I, Robot (1950), The Complete Robot (1982), and Robot Visions (1990). "Robbie" was the fourteenth story written by Asimov, and the ninth to be published. The story is also part of Asimov's Robot series, and was the first of Asimov's positronic robot stories to see publication.

The story centers on the technophobia that surrounds robots, and how it is misplaced. Almost all previously published science fiction stories featuring robots followed the theme 'robot turns against creator'; Asimov has consistently held the belief that the Frankenstein complex was a misplaced fear, and the majority of his works attempted to provide examples of the help that robots could provide humanity.

In 2016 Robbie won a retrospective 1941 Hugo Award for best short story.

History
Asimov wrote "Robbie" in May 1939. He was inspired to write a story about a sympathetic robot by the story "I, Robot" by Otto Binder, which had recently been published in the January 1939 issue of Amazing Stories.

After John W. Campbell of Astounding Science Fiction rejected the story in June, Asimov briefly hired Frederik Pohl as literary agent, but he could not find a magazine to accept it before becoming editor of Astonishing Stories and Super Science Stories in October 1939. In March 1940 Pohl purchased "Robbie" for the latter magazine, renaming it “Strange Playfellow,” a title Asimov disliked. When the story was reprinted in the first collection of Asimov's robot stories, I, Robot (a title Asimov had not wanted), he succeeded in having his original title of "Robbie" restored.

Plot summary

1940 version
In 1982, a mute RB series robot, nicknamed Robbie, is owned by the Weston family as a nursemaid for their daughter, Gloria.  Mrs. Weston becomes concerned about the effect a robot nursemaid would have on her daughter, since Gloria is more interested in playing with Robbie than with the other children and might not learn proper social skills. Two years after purchasing Robbie, Mr. Weston gives in to his wife's badgering and returns Robbie to the factory.

Since Gloria was so attached to the robot, whom she saw as her best friend, she ceases smiling, laughing, and enjoying life. Despite the continued efforts of her parents, who bought her a dog to substitute for Robbie, she refuses to accept the change and her mood grows progressively worse. Her mother, who rationalizes that it would be impossible for Gloria to forget Robbie when she is constantly surrounded by places where she and Robbie used to play, decides that Gloria needs a change of scenery to help her forget. Mrs. Weston convinces her husband to take them to New York City, where he works. The plan backfires when Gloria assumes that they are going in search of Robbie.

The Westons visit the Museum of Science and Industry; Gloria sneaks away and follows a sign: “This Way to See the Talking Robot,”  a large computer that takes up the whole room and can answer questions posed to it verbally by visitors. Although there is a human present to monitor the questions, he leaves the room when there are no guided tours and this is when Gloria enters. Gloria asks the machine if it knows where Robbie is, which she reasons the machine should know given that Robbie is "a robot… just like you." The computer is unable to comprehend that there may be another thing like it, and breaks down.

After the Westons take their daughter to every conceivable tourist attraction, Mr. Weston, almost out of ideas, approaches his wife with a thought: Gloria could not forget Robbie because she thought of Robbie as a person and not a robot, if they took her on a tour of a robot construction factory, she would see that he was nothing more than metal and electricity. Impressed, Mrs. Weston agrees to a tour of the corporate facilities of Finmark Robot Corporation. During the tour, Mr. Weston requests to see a specific room of the factory where robots construct other robots. That room holds a surprise for Gloria and Mrs. Weston: one of the robot assemblers is Robbie. Gloria runs in front of a moving vehicle in her eagerness to get to her friend and is rescued by Robbie. Mrs. Weston confronts her husband: he had set it all up. When Robbie saves Gloria's life, an unplanned part of the reunion, Mrs. Weston gives in.

1950 revision
The revised version of the story is preceded by extra content which depicts the first appearance (in the stories' internal chronology) of Susan Calvin, and provides continuity with the rest of the anthology I, Robot.  The date is changed to 1998.

Susan, then a college student, is at the Museum of Science and Industry exhibit of the talking robot;  she writes down a couple of observations and leaves, as the question-monitor returns infuriated trying to find out what happened to the machine.

Other changes include:

 References to Robbie's tentacles are changed to hands.
 The Douglas expedition to the moon is changed to the Lefebre-Yoshida expedition to Mars.
 Mr. Weston's explanation, "A robot is infinitely more to be trusted than a human nurse-maid.  Robbie was constructed for only one purpose—to be the companion of a little child.  His entire 'mentality' has been created for the purpose.  He just can't help being faithful and loving and kind.  He's a machine—made so." is replaced by a ret-con reference to the First Law of Robotics.
 The Finmark Robot Corporation is changed to U.S. Robots.
 More details are added on the visivox about Leopard-Men on the Moon.
 The reference to Mr Weston commuting to New York via his private auto-giro is removed.
 The reference to the effects on Mr Weston's heirloom watch of the powerful electro-magnet is deleted.
 The talking robot's "rather dull" answers to mathematical questions are interpolated.
 Various sociological comments, such as "There's bad feeling in the village" and a reference to unions and dislocation (replacing a reference to Mr. Struthers' speech on "Robots and the Future of the Human Being"), are interpolated.  A reference to a law restricting robots on public streets is moved.
 Mrs. Weston's justification for her conclusion that Mr. Weston engineered the reunion, starting with "Robbie wasn't designed for engineering or construction work," is interpolated.

Adaptations
The story was broadcast as episode one of a five-part 15 Minute Drama radio adaptation of I, Robot on BBC Radio 4 in February 2017.

Reception
Groff Conklin called the story "completely charming".

References

External links
 

1940 short stories
Fiction set in 1996
Robot series short stories by Isaac Asimov
Works originally published in Super Science Stories